Meet You There may refer to:

 "Meet You There" (song), a song by Busted from A Present for Everyone
 Meet You There (album), a 2007 album by Oysterband
 "Meet You There", a song by Simple Plan from No Pads, No Helmets...Just Balls
 "Meet You There", a song by 5 Seconds of Summer from Youngblood